Introbio (Valsassinese ) is a comune (municipality) in the Province of Lecco in the Italian region Lombardy, located about  northeast of Milan and about  northeast of Lecco in the Valsassina.

References

External links
 Official website

Cities and towns in Lombardy
Valsassina